Edmund, Earl of Rutland (17 May 1443 – 30 December 1460) was the fourth child and second surviving son of Richard Plantagenet, 3rd Duke of York, and Cecily Neville. He was a younger brother of Edward, Earl of March, the future King Edward IV who came to the throne in 1461, the year after Edmund's death. He was born in Rouen, then the capital of English-occupied France and his father held the office of Lieutenant of France. He was killed at the age of 17 either during or shortly after the Battle of Wakefield, during the Wars of the Roses.

He was created Earl of Rutland by King Henry VI probably at some time before 1454, aged about 11, as Edmund and his elder brother Edward signed a letter to their father on 14 June 1454 as "E. Rutland" and "E. Marche". No record of the creation survives.

Lord Chancellor of Ireland
In 1451, Edmund's father, who held the title of Lord Lieutenant of Ireland, appointed Edmund as Lord Chancellor of Ireland. As Edmund was underage, the duties of the position were held by Deputy Chancellors.
His first Deputy Chancellor was Edmund Oldhall, Bishop of Meath. His brother Sir William Oldhall was Chamberlain to the Duke of York and was likely behind that appointment. He acted as de facto Chancellor until 1454.

Oldhall was replaced by John Talbot, 2nd Earl of Shrewsbury, who also held the office of Lord High Steward of Ireland. He would continue serving as the de facto Chancellor until his death at the Battle of Northampton (10 July 1460).

His appointment and those of his Deputies were acknowledged by the Parliament of Ireland which at this time first asserted its independence. The Parliament declared that Ireland held separate legislature from the Kingdom of England and its subjects were only subject to the laws and statutes of "the Lords Spiritual and Temporal and Commons of Ireland, freely admitted and accepted in their Parliaments and Great Councils".

According to Parliamentary decisions during his term, the Irish subjects were only bound to answer writs by the Great Seal of Ireland, held by the Lord Chancellors. Any officer attempting to enforce the rule of decrees from England would lose all of his property in Ireland and be subject to a fine.

The House of York in Ireland had won the support of Thomas FitzGerald, 7th Earl of Kildare, and James FitzGerald, 6th Earl of Desmond. Several allies of the FitzGeralds followed them in their loyalties. On the other hand, the House of Lancaster found its main Irish supporter in the person of James Butler, 5th Earl of Ormonde.

Death
Edmund died at the age of seventeen either during or shortly after the Battle of Wakefield (30 December 1460) during the Wars of the Roses. He had fought in the battle at the side of his father.  After the tide of battle turned against his father he attempted to escape over Wakefield Bridge, but was overtaken and killed, possibly by the Lancastrian Lord Clifford, to avenge Clifford's father's death at the First Battle of St Albans.

By the account given by Roderick O'Flanagan in his 1870 biography of Edmund:

Urged by his tutor, a priest named Robert Aspell, he was no sooner aware that the field was lost than he sought safety by flight. Their movements were intercepted by the Lancastrians, and Lord Clifford made him prisoner, but did not then know his rank. Struck with the richness of his armour and equipment, Lord Clifford demanded his name. "Save him", implored the Chaplain; "for he is the Prince's son, and peradventure may do you good hereafter."

This was an impolitic appeal, for it denoted hopes of the House of York being again in the ascendant, which the Lancastrians, flushed with recent victory, regarded as impossible. The ruthless noble swore a solemn oath: "Thy father", said he, "slew mine; and so will I do thee and all thy kin;" and with these words he rushed on the hapless youth, and drove his dagger to the hilt in his heart. Thus fell, at the early age of seventeen, Edmund Plantagenet, Earl of Rutland, Lord Chancellor of Ireland.

However this story does not appear in any of the accounts of the battle written by the chroniclers of the time.

Edmund was possibly executed on the orders of the Lancastrian Lord Clifford, or by some accounts, by Lord Clifford himself. His head was displayed spiked upon the gates of York along with those of his father and of his uncle, Richard Neville, 5th Earl of Salisbury.

Edmund and his father were buried at Pontefract Priory. The bodies were reburied, with great pomp, in the family vault at Fotheringhay Castle on 29–30 July 1476.

Lord Clifford would himself be slain in March 1461 at the Battle of Ferrybridge.

In popular culture
In Shakespeare's play, Henry VI, Part 3, Rutland is portrayed as a young boy who is brutally murdered by Clifford after pleading for his life; the source appears to be Edward Hall's 1548 Chronicle, which says, incorrectly, that Rutland is "scarce of the age of twelve years" at his death.

In Sharon Kay Penman's revisionist historical novel The Sunne in Splendour, Edmund is portrayed as a brave, sensitive and wise young man who mentors his youngest brother, Richard, and whose tragic death haunts his oldest brother, Edward, long after he becomes king.

Arms

Ancestors

References

External links
 
The lives of the Lord Chancellors and Keepers of the Great Seal of Ireland, from the earliest times to the reign of Queen Victoria, London 1870

1443 births
1460 deaths
People from Rouen
House of York
House of Plantagenet
People of the Wars of the Roses
Lord chancellors of Ireland
Burials at the Church of Saint Mary and All Saints, Fotheringhay
Earls of Rutland
Younger sons of dukes